Russell Edson (1935 – April 29, 2014) was an American poet, novelist, writer, and illustrator. He was the son of the cartoonist-screenwriter Gus Edson.

Born in Connecticut, Edson studied art early in life and attended the Art Students League as a teenager. He began publishing poetry in the 1950s. His honors as a poet include a Guggenheim fellowship, a Whiting Award, and several fellowships from the National Endowment for the Arts.

Edson self-published several chapbooks and later, numerous collections of prose poetry, fables, two novels, Gulping's Recital and The Song of Percival Peacock, and a book of plays under the title, The Falling Sickness. His final book was See Jack (University of Pittsburgh Press, 2009).

He lived in Darien, Connecticut with his wife Frances.

Selected bibliography
Full-length prose poetry collections
 See Jack (University of Pittsburgh Press, 2009)
 The Rooster's Wife: Poems (BOA Editions, Ltd., 2005)
 The Tormented Mirror (University of Pittsburgh Press, 2001)
 The Tunnel: Selected Poems of Russell Edson (Oberlin College Press, 1994)
 The Wounded Breakfast (Wesleyan University Press, 1985)
 With Sincerest Regrets (Burning Deck Press, 1980)
 The Reason Why the Closet-Man Is Never Sad (Wesleyan University Press, 1977)
 Edson's Mentality (OINK! Press, 1977)
 The Intuitive Journey and Other Works (Harper & Row, 1976)
 Gulping's Recital (Guignol Books, 1984)
 The Clam Theater (Wesleyan University Press, 1973)
 The Childhood Of An Equestrian (Harper & Row, 1973)
 Ceremonies in Bachelor Space (Grapnel Press, Black Mountain College, 1951)

Chapbooks
 Wuck Wuck Wuck! (with linocut by Richard Mock, Red Ozier Press, 1984)

Novels
 Gulping's Recital (Guignol Books, 1984)
 The Song of Percival Peacock: A Novel (Coffee House Press, 1992)

Short Stories & Fables
 Tick Tock: Short Stories (illustrated with woodcuts, Demitasse/Coffee House Press, 1992)
 What a Man Can See: Fables (with drawings by Ray Johnson, 1969)
 The Brain Kitchen: Writings and Woodcuts (Thing Press, 1965)
 The Very Thing That Happens: Fables and Drawings (New Directions Publishing, 1964)
 Appearances: Fables and Drawings (Thing Press, 1961)
 A Stone Is Nobody's: Fables and Drawings (Thing Press, 1961)

Plays
 The Falling Sickness: A Book of Plays (New Directions Publishing, 1975)

Music
 Ketchup opera in 2 acts. Text By Russell Edson, music by Franklin Stover. Scored for 2 voices & chamber orchestra.
 The Song of Percival Peacock - an entertainment for reed quintet and narrator set to prose poems of Russell Edson, by Franklin Stover. (Edition Hohenstaufen, 2017)

Honors and awards
 1992 National Endowment for the Arts Creative Writing Fellowship
 1989 Whiting Award
 1981 National Endowment for the Arts Creative Writing Fellowship
 1976 National Endowment for the Arts Creative Writing Fellowship
 1974 Guggenheim Fellowship

References

External links
 Audio: Garrison Keillor's ''The Writer's Almanac": Poems by Russell Edson
 Biography & Poems: Russell Edson
Profile at The Whiting Foundation
 The Believer (March 2004) Why The Reader of Good Prose Poems Is Never Sad:  An Appreciation of Russell Edson by Sarah Manguso
 Poems: Webdelsol > Featured Prose Poet: Russell Edson
 Review: Cricket Online: Corey Johnson review of The Rooster's Wife by Russell Edson

1935 births
2014 deaths
20th-century American novelists
National Endowment for the Arts Fellows
People from Darien, Connecticut
Novelists from Connecticut
20th-century American poets
American male novelists
American male poets
20th-century American male writers
Black Mountain College alumni